Malus sikkimensis is a rare species of apple known by the common name Sikkim crabapple. Its Chinese name is xi jin hai tang (锡金海棠). It is native to China, Nepal, Bhutan, and part of India, where it is threatened due to loss of habitat. It bears white and pink flowers and dark red fruit.

References

External links

sikkimensis
Crabapples
Flora of China
Trees of Nepal